Vorkuta (Vörkuta; Nenets for "the abundance of bears", "bear corner") is a coal-mining town in the Komi Republic, Russia, situated just north of the Arctic Circle in the Pechora coal basin at the river Vorkuta. In 2010 its population was 70,548, down from 84,917 in 2002. 

Vorkuta is the fourth largest city north of the Arctic Circle and the easternmost town in Europe. It is also the coldest city in all of Europe, boasting a record cold temperature of −52 °C (−61 °F).

Vorkuta's population has dropped steadily since the fall of the Soviet Union, when mines were privatized and many people began moving farther south. Many of the mines have been abandoned and by September 2020, the city's estimated population was only about 50,000. A report in March 2021 described the villages in the area as "ghost towns" with many "abandoned structures".

History
In 1930 the geologist Georgy Chernov (1906–2009) discovered substantial coal fields by the river Vorkuta. Georgy Chernov's father, the geologist  (1877–1963), promoted the development of the Pechora coal basin, which included the Vorkuta fields. With this discovery the coal-mining industry started in the Komi ASSR. (At the time only the southern parts of the field were included in the Komi ASSR. The northern part, including Vorkuta, belonged to the Nenets Autonomous Okrug of Arkhangelsk Oblast.) In 1931 a geologist settlement was established by the coal field, with most of the workers being inmates of the Ukhta-Pechora Camp of the GULAG (Ухтпечлаг, Ukhtpechlag).

Forced labour camp

The origins of the town of Vorkuta are associated with Vorkutlag, one of the most notorious forced-labour camps of the Gulag. Vorkutlag was established in 1932 with the start of mining. It was the largest of the Gulag camps in European Russia and served as the administrative centre for a large number of smaller camps and subcamps, among them Kotlas, Pechora, and Izhma (modern Sosnogorsk). The Vorkuta uprising, a major rebellion by the camp inmates, occurred in 1953.

In 1941 Vorkuta and the labour camp system based around it were connected to the rest of the world by a prisoner-built rail line linking Konosha, Kotlas, and the camps of Inta. Town status was granted to Vorkuta on November 26, 1943.

Administrative and municipal status
Within the framework of administrative divisions, it is, together with eight urban-type settlements (Komsomolsky, Mulda, Oktyabrsky, Promyshlenny, Severny, Vorgashor, Yeletsky, and Zapolyarny) and seven rural localities, incorporated as the town of republic significance of Vorkuta—an administrative unit with the status equal to that of the districts. As a municipal division, the town of republic significance of Vorkuta is incorporated as Vorkuta Urban Okrug.

Economy
By the early 21st century many mines had closed as problems with the high costs of operation plagued the mine operators. Near the end of the 20th century there were labor actions in the area by miners; in the late '80s due to political changes, and during the '90s by those who had not been paid for a year.

Transport
The town is served by Vorkuta Airport. During the Cold War, an Arctic Control Group forward staging base for strategic bombers was located at Vorkuta Sovetsky.

Climate

Vorkuta has a subarctic climate (Köppen Dfc) with short cool summers and very cold and snowy winters. Vorkuta's climate is influenced both by its distance from the North Atlantic and the proximity to the Arctic Ocean, bringing cold air in spring. This extends winters well into May and hinders the characteristic interior Russian summer warmth from reaching the city but for rare instances. In spite of this, Vorkuta has less severe winters than areas a lot further south in Siberia courtesy of the minor maritime moderation that reaches it. This also means that temperatures below  have never been recorded in any winter month but December. With winters being humid, snowfall is a lot more common than in areas further east and a sizeable snow pack is built up each year. Due to the moderately warm summers, Vorkuta lies below the Arctic tree line.

The polar day in Vorkuta lasts from 30 May to 14 July, the polar night lasts from 17 December to 27 December.

Crumbling permafrost 
Vorkuta lies on the edge of the continuous permafrost boundary in Russia, and scientists predict that continued warming could advance the border of continuous permafrost hundreds of miles northward, weakening the earth beneath the vast infrastructure built during the days of the Soviet Union's industrialization of the Arctic.

Notable people
 Pavel Kulizhnikov, speed skater
 Nikolay Punin, art scholar and writer
 Andrei Nikolishin, National Hockey League player

Miscellaneous

One of the largest coal mine disasters in Russia occurred at Vorkuta coal mine on 28 February 2016, when leaking methane gas ignited and killed 32 people, including 26 trapped miners who had been stranded by a similar explosion three days earlier that had killed four miners.

In 2021, Moscow-based photographer Maria Passer photographed abandoned scenes in Vorkuta as part of a photography project that also included the villages of Cementozavodsky and Severny.

References

Notes

Sources

Adapted from the article Vorkuta, from Wikinfo, licensed under the GNU Free Documentation License.

External links
The official website of Vorkuta 
Vorkutlag-Vorkuta. Double remembrance to the Soviet history of the city.
Vorkuta. History 
First webcam Vorkuta overlooking the main street of the city 
Webcam Online
Contemporary photographs of Vorkuta
Contemporary photographs of the city on the webpage of the local mine rescue association
1996 photos of Vorkuta
Links to photos of Vorkuta and Usinsk, 1998 
Rusko 2005 – Galerie: Vorkuta 
Historical photographs
Gulag report - Vorkuta
Gulag settlement outside Vorkuta
Other photographs
Wooden crosses of the German prisoners of the Gulag
Vorkuta coal mines
Places and mines - Vorkuta 

Cities and towns in the Komi Republic
Cities and towns built in the Soviet Union
Populated places of Arctic Russia
Geography of Gulag
Populated places established in 1936
Road-inaccessible communities of Russia